Borough Hill is a large multivallate hillfort near Sawston, Cambridgeshire, England.

Description

References

Hill forts in Cambridgeshire
Sawston